Several special routes of U.S. Route 74 exist. In order from west to east they are as follows.

Existing

Asheville–Forest City alternate route

U.S. Route 74 Alternate (US 74A) was established in 1994, replaced the old mainline US 74 route when US 74 was moved onto the Solon David Smart Memorial Highway and I-26.  The alignment of US 74A varies greatly from the current parent route. US 74A traverses through downtown Asheville, goes through the mountain resort communities of Chimney Rock and Lake Lure, continues to Ruth, passes between the towns of Rutherfordton and Spindale, and bypasses Forest City to the south. US 74, joins I-40 eastbound west of Asheville, and switches onto I-26 eastbound through Fletcher, bypassing most of urban Asheville. Continuing along a southeasterly course, the parent US 74 passes by Hendersonville and splits from I-26 at Columbus; after passing south of Rutherfordton, US 74 meets the eastern terminus of US 74A.

US 74A is concurrent with US 64 from Ruth in the east through Lake Lure, where NC 9 joins, and Chimney Rock; the three routes separate in Bat Cave. NC 9 splits to the north, US 64 to the south; US 74A alone continues west from that point. In Asheville, US 74A has many concurrencies; US 70 is concurrent with US 74A in east and downtown Asheville and Interstate 26, I-240, US 19/US 23 are concurrent with US 74A west of downtown. Near US 74A's western terminus, US 19/US 23 are concurrent with US 74A. NC 81 overlaps with US 74A for a short  segment in southeast Asheville. Between Asheville and Gerton, US 74A bears the street name Charlotte Highway. East of Gerton, the road is named the Gerton Highway until arriving at Bat Cave. Through towns and cities, the road takes various names including Main Street and Railroad Avenue.

US 74A is overlapped by two North Carolina scenic byways: Drovers Road (Asheville to Bat Cave) and Black Mountain Rag (Bat Cave to Lake Lure).

Major junctions

Rutherfordton–Forest City business loop

U.S. Route 74 Business (US 74 Bus) was established in 1960 as a renumbering of US 74A, it traversed along Washington Street and Charlotte Road in Rutherfordton.  In December 1970, US 74 was extended east through Spindale, Forest City, and Ellenboro when US 74 was placed on new freeway bypass.  In 1994, US 74 was moved south onto a new alignment towards Columbus, converting the old mainline into US 74A; as a result, US 74 Business was rerouted in Rutherfordton to go south in concurrency with US 221 to the US 74 freeway.

Shelby business loop

U.S. Route 74 Business (US 74 Bus) was established in 1960 as a renumbering of US 74A, following Marion Street and Warren Street.  In December 1971, the eastern portion of Warren Street was changed, forcing eastbound US 74 Business to be rerouted north on DeKalb Street then onto Marion Street.

Kings Mountain business loop

U.S. Route 74 Business (US 74 Bus) was established in 1984, it was a renumbering of the old mainline US 74 through Kings Mountain. US 74 Business begins at US 74 west of Kings Mountain. The route is routed along Shelby Road into the town. US 74 Business runs through the downtown of area Kings Mountain before reaching US 74 again on the eastern side of Kings Mountain.

Monroe Expressway

U.S. Route 74 Bypass (US 74 Byp.), also known as the Monroe Expressway, is a  toll road that bypass north of Monroe, between Stallings and east of Wingate. The highway’s purpose is to improve mobility and capacity along the US 74 corridor. At a cost of approximately $840 million and right-of-way acquisition already completed, construction was originally to begin in October 2012; however, because of several environmental issues and litigation, the project was delayed until May 2015. On November 27, 2018, the Monroe Expressway opened to traffic.

The Monroe Expressway uses all-electronic tolling, with tolls payable with valid transponder (NC Quick Pass, E-ZPass, Peach Pass or SunPass) or Bill by mail, which uses automatic license plate recognition. Tolls are collected per gantry, seven in total, which are located between each exit along the bypass. As of July 24, 2018, the total trip rate is $2.54 with valid transponder and $3.92 via bill by mail.

Rockingham–Hamlet business loop

U.S. Route 74 Business (US 74 Bus) was established in 2003 as a renumbering of the mainline US 74 through Rockingham and Hamlet.

Laurinburg–Maxton business loop

U.S. Route 74 Business (US 74 Bus) was established in 1967 as a renumbering of mainline US 74 through Laurinburg.  In 1984, it was extended east replacing mainline US 74 through Maxton.

Maxton–Lumberton alternate route

U.S. Route 74 Alternate (US 74 Alt) was established in 2007 when mainline US 74 and I-74 were realigned to a new freeway south of the old route, between Maxton to near Lumberton.  The route, just south of the banks of the Lumber River, goes through mostly farmland. In between, NC 710 connect travelers to Pembroke, where the University of North Carolina at Pembroke is located. Highway signs along the route are signed as "Alternate" or "ALT" above US 74; as opposed to US 74A, which is used in Western North Carolina.

Chadbourn–Whiteville business loop

U.S. Route 74 Business (US 74 Bus) was established in 1975 to replace the old mainline US 74 through Chadbourn and Whiteville.  The route is mostly in concurrency with US 76 Business.

Future

Shelby Bypass

U.S. Route 74 Bypass (US 74 Byp.) is the future designation of the Shelby Bypass; currently being constructed in phases. The designation, listed on NCDOT documents, has not been submitted/approved by AASHTO.

As of July 2020, the segment from the exit with U.S. Route 74 to the current interchange of NC 226 (Polkville Road) has been open and further extensions of the route will be coming soon. The segment from NC 226 (Polkville Road) to NC 150 (Cherryville Road) is already on construction and will be subject to open to traffic in 2022. The last segment of the bypass will extend west of Stony Point Road to U.S. Route 74 Business in Kings Mountain which is subject to open in 2024.

Former

Rutherfordton alternate route

U.S. Route 74 Alternate (US 74A) was established in 1948 or 1949, it followed the original US 74 route through Rutherfordton, as the mainline US 74 was placed on a new bypass route through Ruth.  Traversing along Washington Street and Charlotte Road, it was renumbered US 74 Business in 1960.

Shelby alternate route

U.S. Route 74 Alternate (US 74A) was established in 1936 as a new primary routing using Marion Street through Shelby; paralleling mainline US 74, which was on Warren Street.  Around 1949, US 74 was moved onto new bypass south of Shelby; US 74A was thus extended on both directions.  As part of this development, US 74A was split west on Marion Street and east on Warren Street.  In 1960 it was renumbered to US 74 Business.

Bessemer City alternate route

U.S. Route 74 Alternate (US 74A) was established in 1937, this alternate route, along with US 29A, followed the old routing from Kings Mountain to Gastonia, via Bessemer City.  A year later, it was renumbered as NC 161 and NC 274.

Monroe alternate route 1

U.S. Route 74 Alternate (US 74A) was established between 1945–49, it was set up as an inner bypass of downtown Monroe, via Jefferson Street.  It was decommissioned in 1952 when US 74 moved out of the downtown area, converting the old route, along Charlotte Avenue and Franklin Street, into the second alternate route.

Monroe alternate route 2

U.S. Route 74 Alternate (US 74A) was established in 1952, it replaced the old mainline US 74 through downtown Monroe, via Franklin Street and Charlotte Avenue.  In 1953, it was rerouted along Skyway Drive when US 74 was completely realigned onto new bypass routing between Matthews and Monroe.  In 1954, it was decommissioned.

Rockingham alternate route

U.S. Route 74 Alternate (US 74A) was established between 1951–53, after US 74 was rerouted south of downtown Rockingham.  The alternate route followed the old alignment along Washington Street and Rockingham Road.  In 1957 it was decommissioned.

Leland alternate route

U.S. Route 74 Alternate (US 74A) was established in 1936, it replaced mainline US 74 through an intersection in Leland, while the mainline was moved just off to the right on Village Road.  At , it was the shortest alternate route.  It was unsigned throughout its existence, but was marked on state and county maps up until 1975, when NCDOT downgraded it to secondary road status.

Wrightsville Beach alternate route

U.S. Route 74 Alternate (US 74A) was established by 1938 as new primary routing, it went from Causeway Drive south along Waynick Boulevard, ending on the south-end of Wrightsville Beach; making it a spur route of US 74.  By 1940, it was replaced by an extension of US 76.

References

External links

74
74
U.S. Route 74